Benninghof Run is a  long stream that begins on the divide between Oil Creek and Cherrytree Run in Venango County, Pennsylvania.  The mouth of the creek is located in Oil Creek State Park.

References

Rivers of Venango County, Pennsylvania
Rivers of Pennsylvania
Tributaries of the Allegheny River